is a video game in the Momotaro Dentetsu series of board game-style video games, genre released in 2002 by Hudson Soft for the PlayStation 2 and Nintendo GameCube. The game was only released in Japan.

Reception
On release, Famitsu magazine scored both the GameCube version and the PlayStation 2 version of the game a 34 out of 40.

References

2002 video games
GameCube games
Hudson Soft games
Japan-exclusive video games
PlayStation 2 games
Digital tabletop games
Video games based on Japanese mythology
Video games developed in Japan